Qarah Chay or Qareh Chay may refer to various places in Iran:
 Qarah Chay-e Hajji Ali, East Azerbaijan Province
 Qarah Chay-e Naqshi, East Azerbaijan Province
 Qareh Chay, Markazi
 Qareh Chay, Tafresh, Markazi Province
 Qarah Chay, North Khorasan
 Qarah Chay, Razavi Khorasan
 Qareh Chay District, in Markazi Province
 Qareh Chay Rural District, in Markazi Province